Leccinum subspadiceum is a species of bolete fungus in the family Boletaceae. It was described as new to science in 1968 by mycologists Alexander H. Smith, Harry Delbert Thiers, and Roy Watling.

See also
List of Leccinum species
List of North American boletes

References

Fungi described in 1968
Fungi of North America
subspadiceum